The term semi-monocoque or semimonocoque refers to a stressed shell structure that is similar to a true monocoque, but which derives at least some of its strength from conventional reinforcement.  Semi-monocoque construction is used for, among other things, aircraft fuselages, car bodies and motorcycle frames.

Examples of semi-monocoque vehicles

Semi-monocoque aircraft fuselages differ from true monocoque construction through being reinforced with longitudinal stringers.  The Mooney range of four seat aircraft, for instance, use a steel tube truss frame around the passenger compartment with monocoque behind.

The British ARV Super2 light aircraft has a fuselage constructed mainly of aluminium alloy, but with some fibreglass elements.  The cockpit is a stiff monocoque of "Supral" alloy, but aft of the cockpit bulkhead, the ARV is conventionally built, with frames, longerons and stressed skin forming a semi-monocoque.

Peter Williams' 1973 Formula 750 TT-winning John Player Norton racer was an early example of a semi-monocoque motorcycle.

See also
 Monocoque
 Stressed skin

References

Structural engineering
Aircraft components